Nahyan may refer to:

Nahyan bin Mubarak Al Nahyan, United Arab Emirati politician
Al-Nahyan Stadium, multi-purpose stadium in Abu Dhabi, United Arab Emirates
Al Nahyan family, United Arab Emirati family

Arabic-language surnames
Arabic masculine given names